Michael G. Millman (July 9, 1939 – May 31, 2014) was an American criminal defense lawyer, founder of the California Appellate Project, and an anti-death penalty activist.

Family and education
Michael Millman was born in Brooklyn, N.Y., and he grew up in Summit, N.J. Millman was the only child of Sidney, a physicist, and Dorothy, a teacher. Millman graduated from Harvard University in 1960 with a degree in physics and obtained a master's degree in physics from UC Berkeley. Moved by the social justice activism of the 1960s, Millman decided to study law—instead of science—and graduated from Yale Law School in 1969. During the civil rights movement he worked with, and was deeply inspired by, Alabama Attorney Fred Gray, who had represented Dr. Martin Luther King, Rosa Parks, and other movement leaders.

Millman married Cynthia Taylor Millman. He had three children Dr. Laura Dillard, David Millman, and Matthew Millman. He had three stepchildren from his marriage to Cynthia; and 13 grandchildren.

Legal career
After law school, Millman worked for the Alameda County public defender for about six years. He then joined the Office of the State Public Defender and became its death penalty coordinator after state lawmakers reinstated capital punishment in 1977.

In 1983, The State Bar of California created The California Appellate Project as a legal resource center to implement the constitutional right to counsel for indigent persons facing Capital punishment in California. At around the time of its founding, Millman became the director of CAP. Millman served as director of CAP for 30 years. In his role at CAP, he oversaw the efforts to assist private lawyers representing the more than 700 people on California's death row. He had a close, direct relationship with the California Supreme Court for more than 25 years in his role as the executive director of CAP.

Millman was also active in the California Attorneys for Criminal Justice, serving as President of its Board of Governors in 1984. He also served on a Supreme Court committee formed to improve the timely handling of capital case appeals and habeas corpus petitions. In 2013, Millman was awarded CACJ's Significant Contributions to Criminal Justice Lifetime Achievement Award.

Michael Millman was a founding member of Death Penalty Focus, which is committed to the abolition of the death penalty through public education, grassroots organizing and political advocacy,
media outreach, and domestic and international coalition building. Millman was also affiliated with the Death Penalty Information Center—working with Anthony Amsterdam and other death penalty litigation leaders—and served as President of its board. In April 2014, Death Penalty Focus awarded Mr. Millman a Lifetime Achievement Award for his "unwavering commitment to providing high-quality representation to indigent people on death row." He occasionally lectured at bay area law schools, such as Stanford Law School and others.

Death and tributes
On May 31, 2014, Mr. Millman died from pancreatic cancer. Chief Justice of the California Supreme Court Tani G. Cantil-Sakauye said of Millman: "Michael Millman was a pillar of the capital defense bar, a hero to many, and a true gentleman. He will be sorely missed, and we are deeply saddened by this great loss." Lance Lindsey, the administrative director of CAP, said: "Michael was a profoundly kind and big-hearted man who dedicated his whole life to advancing social justice and, especially, to 'being the change we wish to see in the world' by daily acts of compassion and generosity." The President of the American Bar Association James Silkenat paid tribute to Millman: "As someone who also cares deeply about justice, I thank
you for all that you have done to make this world a better place. You are the kind of lawyer and human being that we all aspire to be."

Quotes
 "I'm a lawyer. I try to persuade people by appeals to the logic, the fairness, of the law. I have not been very successful. The California Supreme Court affirms virtually every capital case it decides. It finds there was no error in the trial proceedings, or that any possible error was harmless."
 "The America I believe in does not torture or execute people."
 "We have not gone gentle into that good night. We do not roll over…. Our commitment will overwhelm indifference and inertia."

References

External links
 Appellate Project Celebrates 20 years
 Tribute to Michael Millman

American anti–death penalty activists
1939 births
2014 deaths
Public defenders
Harvard University alumni
Yale Law School alumni
University of California, Berkeley alumni
People from Summit, New Jersey
Criminal defense lawyers
Lawyers from San Francisco
20th-century American lawyers